Design 1047, also known as Project 1047, was a series of plans for a class of Dutch battlecruisers prior to the Second World War. These large capital ships were intended to counter the threat posed by Japanese aggression towards the Dutch colonies in the East Indies.

Dutch intelligence believed that if it came to war, the Imperial Japanese Navy would deploy its capital ships (aircraft carriers and battleships) against their counterparts of the United States Navy and the British Royal Navy. That would leave heavy and light cruisers, along with seaplane carriers, as the largest warships available for an advance into the East Indies.

To combat a force of these ships, in the 1930s the Koninklijke Marine (Royal Netherlands Navy) prepared designs for a new class of battlecruisers. Their work was shaped by the perceived need to  fight their way through a fleet of those cruisers and smaller destroyers; the Dutch hoped that this would allow the battlecruisers to act as a fleet in being. However, the Dutch had never designed a modern capital ship, and this was reflected in a preliminary plan completed on 11 July 1939: it was missing many of the post-First World War advances in warship technology, and the armor protection was completely outmoded.

After an extended period of negotiations, Germany and the Netherlands reached an agreement where Germany would release plans and drawings based upon their ideas for a battlecruiser. In return, the Dutch would guarantee that all the required equipment would be ordered from German firms. With German assistance, a rough design was formulated by February 1940. A visit to Italy prompted a rethink of the internal layout, which led to a set of drawings dated 19 April 1940. This is the last known design produced prior to Germany's invasion and occupation of the Netherlands. Final plans for the ships were never completed, and the ships were never constructed.

Background

The Japanese invasion of Manchuria in 1931 marked a period of increasing belligerence from the Japanese Empire, and as the decade progressed the Dutch grew concerned about the security of their East Indies colonies. The islands, which included Java, Sumatra, Borneo and part of New Guinea, were enormously important both politically and strategically to the Dutch, who had lived and traded there for more than three centuries. Over 500,000 settlers had moved from the Netherlands to this "second homeland", and the East Indies possessed abundant valuable resources, the most important of which were the rubber plantations and oilfields; the islands were the fourth-largest exporters of oil in the world, behind the United States, Iran, and Romania.

The Koninklijke Marine had only one seagoing armored ship stationed in the East Indies, the coastal-defense ship  (ex-). As this ship was considered to be "of little remaining combat value", three light cruisers (and ), a few destroyers, and a large submarine fleet were charged with the main naval defense of the islands.

The Dutch believed that if war broke out, Japan's capital ships would be preoccupied with the battleships of the United States Navy and the British Royal Navy, meaning that the defenses of the East Indies would need to cope only with Japan's cruisers. However, the ships were more powerful than their Dutch equivalents and Japan would also have the advantage of numbers. It was estimated that by 1944, should no new vessels be ordered, the five light cruisers of the Koninklijke Marine (two of the, which were laid down prior to the First World War, and two of the) could be facing 18 heavy and 27 light Japanese cruisers.

These factors forced the Koninklijke Marine to bolster this force, and so the construction of three "super cruisers" capable of overpowering cruisers of the Imperial Japanese Navy was contemplated. The Washington Naval Treaty and London Naval Treaty limited new cruisers of their signatory nations to not more than a 10,000-ton displacement and  guns, but as a relatively minor naval power the Netherlands had not been party to the treaties and was not bound by their restrictions. According to Dutch naval intelligence, the Japanese cruisers did not participate in exercises with the main fleet of battleships and fleet carriers, instead operating with seaplane carriers, so it was assumed that the battlecruisers would not have to face overwhelming carrier-based air strikes. Moreover, the presence of these powerful ships—whose larger guns could easily out-range any escorting cruisers or destroyers—would give the Dutch a fleet in being in the East Indies that could delay or end plans for an amphibious assault for fear that the invasion would be disrupted or the attacking fleet destroyed.

Design

In 1938, a number of high-ranking naval officers within the Koninklijke Marine gathered to discuss possible improvements to the navy. They concluded that the Dutch should have a navy strong enough to force an enemy to "use such a large part of his military potential that there would be an unacceptable weakening of his capabilities in other theaters". The ships formed a key part of a naval rearmament program which was generally called the "Dutch Battlecruiser Plan 1939". This was to also include the acquisition of at least two destroyers, seven submarines and several motor torpedo boats. Most of these vessels were to be deployed to the East Indies upon completion.

Requirements for the new battlecruiser design were laid down by the navy a day before the order from van Dijk was made; they included the ability to steam for 12 hours at 32 knots, an endurance of 4,500 nautical miles at 20 knots, a maximum of fifteen minutes for the ship to go from 20 to 30 knots, protection for the engine room that would allow the ship to take hits in that area without being slowed, a draft not to exceed 9 meters, and capacity for six weeks' worth of supplies. Desired weaponry was nine 280 mm guns in three triple turrets for the main armament, with each gun capable of firing independently, a dual-purpose secondary armament of 120 mm guns in four twin mounts, and an anti-aircraft battery of fourteen  in pairs with centralized fire control. Aircraft were to be two fighters and two reconnaissance aircraft. Specific values were given for each aspect of the design's armor, which featured substantial anti-torpedo and mine protection and a defense against 28 cm shells and 300 kg bombs.

Preliminary designs
As 1913 plans for 24,650-ton dreadnoughts were never brought to fruition due to the First World War, the Dutch had no prior experience in building such large ships. Moreover, they lacked any significant source of information on more modern vessels; the only material available was unclassified and public sources like Jane's Fighting Ships. Facing these constraints, the Dutch turned to foreign sources for technical assistance.

Although they hoped that the French would release plans for their  of 'fast battleships', they decided to focus their effort on Hitler's Germany.

A draft design was completed without foreign assistance by the Construction Department on 11 July 1939, but it did not reflect the numerous technical developments that had entered capital ship designs after the First World War. In particular, its armor scheme was utterly obsolete, as it lacked any substantial amount of deck armor or good underwater protection; it came closer to the designs of 20 to 25 years previous than to that of a modern warship.

Despite German interest in the battlecruiser project, the two sides could not agree on terms. The German delegation insisted that orders placed in their country be guaranteed, with financial compensation to be paid to German companies if the Dutch did not construct the ships. They also refused to release a complete set of plans for the Scharnhorsts. Further complicating negotiations, the Dutch Cabinet, which would have to approve any deal, did not convene during the summer of 1939.

While awaiting official approval, Dutch planning went ahead. A contract with Ferrostaal A.G. Essen was drawn up, and on  a list of products for purchase in Germany was submitted. Two months later, talks were held in Bremen and Berlin (on 13 and 31 July, respectively) in which the Germans agreed to release plans and drawings that, although not specifically of the Scharnhorst-class, would reveal their ideas on battlecruiser design. Delivered on 21 August 1939, these showed various modern protection schemes that could be used in the new battlecruisers. On 4 October, a German admiral previously appointed as a liaison between the two navies asserted that while Germany could not guarantee punctual delivery dates, it could assure the Netherlands that it would pressure the companies to meet the contractual dates and that the Kriegsmarine would not interfere with orders from the same companies. A month later, Ferrostaal A.G. Essen was formally appointed as the Dutch proxy in most of their dealings with Germany; this appointment did not include Germaniawerft.

Work on armament for the new designs was contracted to Germaniawerft; the Dutch met with the company on 31 July 1939 and supplied the characteristics for the main and secondary armament. Turret armor, main armament depression and elevation (°, obtained through the use of hydraulics), and the muzzle velocity for the guns were all specified. Requirements for the secondary armament included a maximum depression of °, a maximum elevation of °, and approximate armor values for their mounts (80 mm front, 150 mm roof, 50 mm sides). The fire control arrangement was discussed on 6 November 1939 with the Dutch company NV Hazemeyer Signaal Apparatenfabriek.

By this time the propulsion plant, which was to be built in the Netherlands, was taking shape. Requirements sent out in August 1939 mandated that the ships have eight boiler rooms, four sets of geared turbines, and 180,000 shp. After further improvements, Nevesbu and two German firms (Germaniawerft was responsible for the turbines and Deschimag for the boilers) began sketching preliminary plans. These were then incorporated into two different design studies, one by Nevesbu and the other by NV Ingenieurskantoor voor Scheepsbouw (IvS). IvS was purportedly a Dutch company linking Dutch and German designers, but in reality functioned as a front company for German interests. Their design was probably based upon a set of plans drawn up by the Ship Construction Office of the German Navy and received in the Netherlands on 31 August. It did not give the propulsion machinery enough space, and it was thought that this design did not provide enough room for magazines. Nevertheless, it was taken into discussions with the Dutch, where the 11 July design was merged with it. IvS came out with one further plan on 11 March 1940, the merits of which were discussed with the Dutch in April of that year.

Design studies
In December 1939 the two studies produced their design proposals; both were capable of 180,000 shp and both had similar boiler capabilities, but the Dutch design was  larger than the German. Although it had the advantage of smaller size, the Dutch were concerned that the German design's power plant might not be capable of operating without problems (the Kriegsmarine did indeed face plant problems during the war).

December also saw real doubts start to creep over the project, as a new Navy Minister had been appointed, and he believed that the Dutch would be better off acquiring a modern version of the old armored cruiser type. Even though these vessels would have been superior to any -gunned,  treaty cruiser, it was felt that too many compromises would be necessary. The belt and deck armor were judged inadequate, but to achieve the same protection as the battlecruiser design would mean no armament could be fitted. The smaller design also did not feature the speed advantage over opponents that the battlecruisers had. For these reasons the Navy "strongly recommended against the construction of such a ship", and the proposal was abandoned.

The plan for three battlecruisers was authorized in February 1940; they, along with two light cruisers of the Eendracht class, would be responsible for the main sea defense of the East Indies. The new light cruisers would replace the older , which would then assume the role of gunnery training ships from grossly obsolete ships such as the protected cruiser , which had been laid down more than forty years prior. The authorization of large battlecruisers meant that a new 40,000-ton floating dock would be built and many improvements to their planned base in the East Indies, the naval yard in Soerabaya, would begin. To construct such a ship, a new  building way was begun by the Netherlands Construction Company, Ltd.

Germany's refusal to give the Dutch access to plans detailing the design of the Scharnhorsts below the waterline was a major problem. Inexperienced in designing an underwater protection scheme for a ship of this size, the Dutch were forced to turn to Italy for assistance, which allowed a delegation of engineers and naval officers to enter the country in February 1940. While the Dutch delegation was barred from viewing technical drawings of the under-construction battleship , possibly to ensure that the details of their Pugliese system remained a secret, they were given access to the completed , toured several shipyards, interviewed the Chief Constructor of the Italian Navy, and received additional information on the Scharnhorsts (as the Italians—Germany's ally—knew some details of the ships).

Although the issues the Dutch designers were having with their propulsion system were discussed, the delegation came away from Italy entirely uninspired by the Italians' efforts in that area. On the other hand, the visit provoked a drastic reworking of the internal subdivision of the proposed battlecruisers. The designers got rid of the previously required central longitudinal bulkhead and attempted to raise the double bottom to provide greater protection against magnetic torpedoes. Due to the requirement for a shallow draft, this modification had to be abandoned.

Last design
When another delegation was sent to Germany to discuss the problems with the battlecruisers, the Dutch took their evolving design with them. Dated 19 April 1940, this was the final version prior to the invasion of the Netherlands by Germany; Design 1047 was never fully completed. Although the propulsion was not yet finalized, the requirements had been re-examined in March 1940 to ascertain if 160,000 shp would be enough, taking into account that a plant that would produce 180,000 shp in tropical water would in northern regions produce ca. 200,000 shp—warmer waters adversely affect a steam turbine's efficiency. The updated requirements also called for eight Yarrow boilers fitted in four boiler rooms, and four Parsons geared turbines in two engine rooms, to drive four propellers at either 40,000 or 45,000 shp each (40,000 in tropic water conditions, 45,000 in North Sea conditions). Length requirements for the machinery had also been altered, once in early March and again on 20 April 1940; a total length of 79.5 meters was now called for.

Armament

The table of characteristics provided by Lt. Jurrien S. Noot for the 19 April 1940 design does not give any armament specifics, as these likely remained unaltered from the earlier 16 February 1940 drawing. That drawing provided the following: a main armament of nine 283 mm guns, a secondary armament of twelve 120 mm dual purpose guns, and an anti-aircraft defense consisting of fourteen Bofors 40 mm guns and eight Oerlikon 20 mm cannons.

Work on the main armament was contracted to Germaniawerft, which based its designs for the turrets, mountings, and guns of the 1047s on the 28 cm SK C/34 used on the Scharnhorst class. The guns would have been able to be elevated to a maximum angle of 45° and trained to 150°, while the loading angle would have been about 2°.

Secondary armament was planned to be twelve Bofors  guns in dual mounts. It is unclear whether or not these were intended to be an older version of the gun (which had been mounted as the main armament on Dutch destroyers since the 1920s) or an entirely new version. Detailed specifics such as range or rate of fire are also unknown; had the older gun been used it would in any case have been updated (including the use of dual instead of single half-shield mounts), and the more modern version did not see service until 1950, by which time it incorporated improvements from lessons learned during the war.

Close-in anti-aircraft defense would have been provided by 40 mm and 20 mm guns. Arguably the best light anti-aircraft gun of the Second World War, the 40 mm Bofors was used for air defense both on land and at sea by many of the countries involved, including the Americans, British, Dutch, Japanese, and Swedish. Produced in the early 1930s, it first entered service with the Royal Netherlands Navy when the cruisers Java and Sumatra were refitted in 1934–35. Before the Second World War, Hazemeyer, a Dutch subsidiary of the German company Siemens & Halske, had devised "a very advanced triaxial mounting together with a tachymetric control system" for the 40 mm gun. When the Netherlands fell in 1940, this was brought to the UK aboard the minesweeper Willem van der Zaan, where it was copied and put into service as the British Mark IV twin mount. The description of the proposed fire control mechanism for the 1047s, discussed on 6 November 1939, mentions that the 40 mm weapons were "to be controlled autonomously from the gun positions"; this seems to describe Hazemeyer's system, but no direct link is made in sources.

The Dutch Navy had already acquired a quantity of the Hispano Suiza 20mm guns before the war for mounting in torpedo boats and other craft and 6 of these were mounted in the cruiser Jacob van Heemskerck when she made her escape to Britain in 1940. The Hispano fired similar but not interchangeable 20 × 110 ammunition to the Oerlikon but had a higher rate of fire and slightly higher muzzle velocity. The Hispano Suiza was insufficiently durable for shipboard use but later became a highly successful aircraft gun.

Differences from the Scharnhorst class 
Despite their superficially similar appearance, there were many differences between the Scharnhorst class and the final incarnation of the Dutch design. The 1047 was inferior in its armor protection, but in other respects was far superior: the main guns could be elevated ° higher, the anti-torpedo system was thicker, the deck protection better accommodated the ship boilers, the quadruple-screw design increased redundancy, and the design did not make use of the problematic German high-pressure power plant. In addition, the 1047s' anti-aircraft armament was far superior to the Scharnhorst class. The use of twelve  dual purpose guns—able to function in both anti-surface and anti-aircraft roles—as opposed to the German division between  anti-surface guns and  anti-aircraft guns, was a more effective secondary armament: it saved needed space and weight on the ships and simplified logistics by requiring just one size of secondary ammunition.

Fate

With the outbreak of the Second World War, almost all design work was halted, although work on turrets and gunnery arrangements by Germaniawerft's designers continued until the German invasion of the Netherlands in May. The first 1047-class ship was scheduled to be completed in 1944, so would in any case have been too late to stop the Japanese advance into the Dutch East Indies. Due to the war, final plans for the ships were never completed, and the ships were never constructed.

See also 

 Dutch 1913 battleship proposal
 Dutch Empire

Notes

References

Bibliography

Further reading

External links
 Concept image of a 1047
 Design studies for the Royal Netherlands Navy 1939–40

Battlecruiser classes
Cruisers of the Royal Netherlands Navy
Abandoned military projects of the Netherlands
Cruisers of Germany
Proposed ships